Right action may refer to:

Right Action, a song by Franz Ferdinand
Right conduct, a core precept of Buddhism
Right group action, a mathematical function